John Henry Tudhope  & bar (17 April 1891 - 12 October 1956) was a South African flying ace credited with 10 victories in World War I. After the war, he emigrated to Canada and joined the RCAF.

Tudhope surveyed routes for the Trans-Canada Air Lines, receiving the McKee Trophy for his work in 1930. In 1937, he flew the first dawn to dusk flight across Canada, from Montreal to Vancouver, British Columbia. He became president of the first Aviation Insurance Group in Canada. He died in London, England, while serving as telecommunications attache at Canada House.

References 

Aviation history of Canada
South African aviators
Canadian aviators
South African World War I flying aces
Canadian World War I flying aces
South African people of British descent
White South African people
1891 births
1956 deaths
Recipients of the Military Cross
South African emigrants to Canada
People from Johannesburg